Goodbye Earth is an upcoming South Korean streaming television series written by Jung Sung-joo, directed by Kim Jin-min, and starring Yoo Ah-in, Ahn Eun-jin, Jeon Sung-woo and Kim Yoon-hye. It is scheduled to be released on Netflix in the fourth quarter of 2023.

Synopsis 
Goodbye Earth depicts the story of people living in a world in chaos ahead of the predicted apocalypse, 200 days until the Earth and an asteroid collide.

Cast 
 Yoo Ah-in as Yoon Sang-eun
 Se-kyung's longtime lover and a researcher at a biotechnology research institute.
 Ahn Eun-jin as Jin Se-kyung
 A volunteer at Ungcheon City Hall who struggles secretly to protect children in danger.
 Jeon Sung-woo as Woo Seong-jae
 An assistant priest who takes care of the believers, on behalf of the chief priest who disappeared after the asteroid incident was announced.
 Kim Yoon-hye as Kang In-ah
 A company commander of a combat service support battalion.
 Kim Kang-hoon

Production 
On January 13, 2022, casting was confirmed by the production. In May 2022, it was reported that the filming is currently in progress.

References

External links
 
 Production website at IMTV 
 
 

Korean-language Netflix original programming
2020s South Korean television series
Upcoming Netflix original programming 
Apocalyptic television series
Dystopian television series
2023 South Korean television series debuts
South Korean science fiction television series
Television series about impact events
Television shows based on Japanese novels
Upcoming television series